Taking Children Seriously (T.C.S.) is a parenting movement and educational philosophy whose central idea is that it is possible and desirable to raise and educate children without either doing anything to them against their will or making them do anything against their will.

Overview
T.C.S began in 1994 as an online mailing-list created by Sarah Fitz-Claridge and David Deutsch, a theoretical physicist at Oxford University.

T.C.S. begins with the observation that most traditional interactions between adults and youth are based on coercion. The T.C.S. model of parenting and education rejects this coercion as infringing on the will of the child, and also rejects parental or educator "self-sacrifice" as infringing on the will of the adult. T.C.S. advocates that parents and children work to find a common preference, a solution all parties genuinely prefer to all other candidate solutions they can think of.

The T.C.S. philosophy was inspired by the epistemology of Karl Popper. Popper was a professional educator himself before he started work in philosophy. In fact, philosophy was only a second option for him at that time, to be able to emigrate to escape the imminent Anschluss. He was active in the Wiener Schulreform (Vienna school reform) movement, and there are connections between the psychology of learning, on which he did his doctoral thesis, and his philosophy. However, as a philosopher, he did not advocate any concrete pedagogy, although he had some general views on the issue. T.C.S. views Popper's epistemology, as did Popper, as a universal theory of how knowledge grows, and tries to work out its profound implications for educational theory.

See also 
 
 Democratic education
 Unschooling
 Voluntaryism

References

Further reading

External links
 Taking Children Seriously Website
 Fallible Living TCS Essays
  Reprinted in the Utne Reader
 
 *

Alternative education
Philosophy of education
Pedagogy
Works about parenting